Tore Lie (born 3 November 1945) is a Norwegian gymnast. He competed in seven events at the 1972 Summer Olympics.

References

1945 births
Living people
Norwegian male artistic gymnasts
Olympic gymnasts of Norway
Gymnasts at the 1972 Summer Olympics
Sportspeople from Bergen